This is a list of performers who have appeared on the American musical dance program Soul Train.

Alphabetized list of celebrity guests

#

 112
 2nd Nature
 3LW
3T
702
7669
 98 Degrees

A

 Aaliyah
 A-ha
 Akon
 All-4-One
 Allure
 ATL
 Ashanti
 Ashford & Simpson
 After 7
 Average White Band

B

 Jon B.
 B2K
 B5
 Baby Bash
 Babyface
 Backstreet Boys
 Erykah Badu
 Baha Men
 Philip Bailey
 Anita Baker
 Tyra Banks
 Rob Base and DJ E-Z Rock
 Beastie Boys
 Bell Biv DeVoe
 Regina Belle
 Eric Benét
 George Benson
 Rhian Benson
 Berlin
 Chuck Berry
 Big Gipp
 Big Daddy Kane
 BlackGirl
 The Black Eyed Peas
 Guerilla Black
 Black Ivory
 Blackstreet
 Bobby Bland
 Blaque
 Blue Magic
 Mary J. Blige
 Kurtis Blow
 Angela Bofill
 Michael Bolton
 Bone Thugs-n-Harmony
 Boney M.
 Bow Wow
 David Bowie
 Tom Bradley
 The Brand New Heavies
 The Brothers Johnson
 Trina Broussard
 Chris Brown
 Bobby Brown
 Foxy Brown 
 Brass Construction
 James Brown
 Jim Brown
 Sleepy Brown
 Boyz II Men
 Brandy
 Toni Braxton
 Peabo Bryson
 Joe Budden
 Jerry Butler
 Busta Rhymes

C

 Cameo
 Tevin Campbell
 Tisha Campbell
 Canela
 Nick Cannon
 Blu Cantrell
 Captain & Tennille
 Irene Cara
 Mariah Carey
 Carl Carlton
 Ralph Carter
 C+C Music Factory
 Cedric the Entertainer
 Chairmen of the Board
 Chamillionaire
 Gene Chandler
 Cheech & Chong
 Cherrelle
 Morris Chestnut
 Chic
 The Chi-Lites
 Chingy
 Chubb Rock
 Ciara
 Corey Clark
 Club Nouveau
 Dennis Coffey
 Keyshia Cole
 Natalie Cole
 Desiree Coleman
 Bootsy Collins
 Color Me Badd
 John Coltrane
 Sean Combs
 Commodores
 Common
 The Controllers
 Con Funk Shun
 Earl Thomas Conley (duet with Anita Pointer)
 Coolio
 The Cover Girls
 Deborah Cox
 Crown Heights Affair
 Culture Club
 Mark Curry

D

 D4L
 Da Brat
 D'Angelo
 Damian Dame
 Jeffrey Daniel
 Billy Davis Jr.
 Ossie Davis
 Tyrone Davis
 Morris Day
 Dazz Band
 DeBarge
 Bunny DeBarge
 Chico DeBarge
 El DeBarge
 Rick Dees
 De La Soul
 Del tha Funkee Homosapien
 The Dells
 The Delfonics
 Dem Franchize Boyz
 Destiny's Child
 DJ Jazzy Jeff & The Fresh Prince
 Lamont Dozier
 Tom Dreesen
 Jermaine Dupri
 Duran Duran
 Dwele
 Dynasty

E

 Sheila E.
 Earth, Wind & Fire
 Sheena Easton
 Dennis Edwards
 Missy Elliott
 The Emotions
 En Vogue
 Eric B. & Rakim
 Eric Monterio
 Faith Evans
 Tiffany Evans
 Eve
 Expose
 Elton John
 Earl Thomas Conley

F

 Fabolous
 Donald Faison
 Lola Falana
 Fantasia
 The Faragher Brothers
 The Fat Boys
 Fat Joe
 Fatty Koo
 José Feliciano
 Kim Fields
 Richard "Dimples" Fields
 The 5th Dimension
 First Choice
 Fishbone
 Five Stairsteps
 Five Star
 Flipsyde
 Floetry
 George Foreman
 For Real
 Four Tops
 Vivica A. Fox
 Jamie Foxx
 Redd Foxx
 Frankie J
 Aretha Franklin
 Kirk Franklin
 Doug E. Fresh
 Friends of Distinction
 Full Force
 Funkadelic

G

 Rosie Gaines
 Gang Starr
 The Gap Band
 Siedah Garrett
 Marvin Gaye
 Nona Gaye
 Ginuwine
 Gloria Gaynor
 Go West
 Goapele
 Graham Central Station
 Larry Graham
 Grandmaster Flash and the Furious Five
 Teresa Graves
 Macy Gray
 Al Green
 Brian Austin Green
 Cee Lo Green
 Vivian Green
 Pam Grier
 Rosey Grier
 Justin Guarini
 Guy
 Jasmine Guy

H

 Deitrick Haddon
 Arsenio Hall
 Hall & Oates
 Anthony Hamilton
 Herbie Hancock
 Jackée Harry
 Dan Hartman
 Steve Harvey
 Donny Hathaway
 Lalah Hathaway
 Isaac Hayes
 Heather Headley
 Heavy D & the Boyz
 Sherman Hemsley
 Michael Henderson
 Nona Hendryx
 Don Henley
 Marcos Hernandez
 Howard Hewett
 Dru Hill
 Gregory Hines
 Simone Hines
 Jennifer Holliday
 Dave Hollister
 Honey Cone
 Telma Hopkins
 Houston
 Marques Houston
 Thelma Houston
 Whitney Houston
 Miki Howard
 Terrence Howard
 The Hues Corporation
 Van Hunt
 Phyllis Hyman

I

 Ice Cube
 Ice-T
 Ike & Tina Turner
 The Impressions
 India.Arie
 James Ingram
 Luther Ingram
 The Intruders
 The Isley Brothers

J

 Frankie J
 Jacki-O
 Freddie Jackson
 The Jackson 5
 Janet Jackson
 Jermaine Jackson
 Jesse Jackson
 La Toya Jackson
 Michael Jackson
 Millie Jackson
 Rebbie Jackson
 Jagged Edge
 Etta James
 Leela James
 Rick James
 Al Jarreau
 Ja Rule
 Wyclef Jean
 Lyfe Jennings
 Jeru the Damaja
 The Jets
 Jhene
 Jodeci
 Joe
 Elton John
 Howard Johnson
 JoJo
 Jon B.
 Donell Jones
 Grace Jones
 Howard Jones
 Mike Jones
 Quincy Jones
 Montell Jordan
 Junior Giscombe

K

 KC and the Sunshine Band
 K-Ci & JoJo
 Kelis
 R. Kelly
 Tara Kemp
 Eddie Kendricks
 Kenny G
 T'Keyah Crystal Keymáh
 Alicia Keys
 Chaka Khan
 Kindred the Family Soul
 B.B. King
 Evelyn King
 George Kirby
 Klique
 Klymaxx
 Gladys Knight & the Pips
 Jean Knight
 Knoc-turn'al
 Solange Knowles
 Kool & the Gang
 Kool Moe Dee
 Apollonia Kotero
 Lenny Kravitz
 Kris Kross
 KRS-One
 Toshinobu Kubota

L

 Labelle
 Patti LaBelle
 Lace
 Lakeside
 Major Lance
 Stacy Lattisaw
 Murphy Lee
 John Legend
 LeToya
 LeVert
 Gerald Levert
 Glenn Lewis
 Ramsey Lewis
 Lil Jon
 Lil' Kim
 Lil' Mo
 Lil' Romeo
 Lina
 Cuban Link
 Lisa Lisa and Cult Jam
 Little Anthony & The Imperials
 Little Milton
 Little Richard
 LL Cool J
 Tone Lōc
 LaToya London
 Loon
 Jennifer Lopez
 The Love Unlimited Orchestra
 L.T.D.
 Carrie Lucas
 Ludacris
 Lumidee
 Cheryl Lynn

M

 Main Ingredient
 Mandrill
 Teena Marie
 Mario
 Ziggy Marley
 Branford Marsalis
 Tisha Campbell
 Mary Jane Girls
 Mickey Mouse Club
 Mary Mary
 Hugh Masekela
 Master P
 Johnny Mathis
 The Manhattan Transfer
 Martha and the Vandellas
 Maxwell
 Midnight Star
 Curtis Mayfield
 MC Hammer
 Marilyn McCoo
 Mantra
 George McCrae
 Michael McDonald
 Brian McKnight
 MC Lyte
 Harold Melvin & the Blue Notes
 Method Man
 Midnight Star
 Christina Milian
 Milli Vanilli
 Stephanie Mills
 The Miracles
 Monica
 Chanté Moore
 Melba Moore
 Teedra Moses
 J. Moss
 Mr. Cheeks
 Mtume
 Letta Mbulu
 Nicole C. Mullen
 Musiq Soulchild
 Mýa
 Mystikal

N

 Johnny Nash
 Nate Dogg
 Naughty by Nature
 Meshell Ndegeocello
 Nelly
 Robbie Nevil
 Aaron Neville
 Newcleus
 New Edition
 New Kids on the Block
 Next
 Denise Nicholas
 Anisha Nicole
 Nivea
 Smokie Norful

O

 O'Bryan
 O'Ryan
 Billy Ocean
 Ohio Players
 The O'Jays
 Omarion
 Shaquille O'Neal
 Jeffrey Osborne
 OutKast
 Oliver Henderson

P

 Ralfi Pagan
 Paula Jai Parker
 Ray Parker Jr.
 Robert Palmer
 Parliament-Funkadelic
 Karyn Parsons
 Billy Paul
 Sean Paul
 Freda Payne
 Walter Payton
 Peaches & Herb
 Pebbles
 Mario Van Peebles
 Nia Peeples
 Holly Robinson Peete
 Teddy Pendergrass
 CeCe Peniston
 Amanda Perez
 Brock Peters
 Pet Shop Boys
 Jazze Pha
 Wilson Pickett
 P.M. Dawn
 Anita Pointer
 Bonnie Pointer
 June Pointer
 The Pointer Sisters
 Billy Preston
 Pretty Ricky
 Pretty Poison
 Prince (& The Revolution)
 Richard Pryor
 Public Enemy
 Pussycat Dolls

Q

 Quad City DJ's
 Queen Latifah

R

 Sheryl Lee Ralph
 Tarralyn Ramsey
 Raven-Symoné
 Lou Rawls
 Raydio
 Ray, Goodman & Brown
 Ray J
 Ready for the World
 Redman
 Alfonso Ribeiro
 Lionel Richie
 Minnie Riperton
 Rockie Robbins
 Smokey Robinson
 Vicki Sue Robinson
 Rockwell
 The Romantics
The Roots
 Diana Ross
 Kelly Rowland
 Rose Royce
 David Ruffin
 Rufus
 Run-D.M.C.
 Patrice Rushen

S

 Buffy Sainte-Marie
 Salt-n-Pepa
 Sammie
 Gloria Scott (singer song writer)
 Jill Scott
 Michael Sembello
 Seventh Wonder
 Shaggy
 Shalamar
 Shanice
 Shannon
 Dee Dee Sharp
 Karen Clark Sheard
 Kierra "Kiki" Sheard
 Silkk the Shocker
 Sinbad
 Sisqó
 Sister Sledge
 Nina Sky
 Skyy
 Slim Thug
 Sly and the Family Stone
 Lonnie Liston Smith
 Snap!
 Snoop Dogg
 Trey Songz
 The SOS Band
 Soul II Soul
 Spandau Ballet
 Aries Spears
 The Spinners
 Mavis Staples
 The Staple Singers
 Starpoint
 Bobby Starr
 Edwin Starr
 Amii Stewart
 Jermaine Stewart
 Sting
 The Stylistics
 The Sugarhill Gang
 Donna Summer
 The Supremes
 Keith Sweat
 SWV
 The Sylvers
 Edmund Sylvers
 Foster Sylvers

T

 Mr. T
 Tag Team
 Take 6
 The Party
 Tamia
 A Taste of Honey
 Taurus
 Tatyana Ali
 Tavares
 The Temptations
 Wallace Terry
 Joe Tex
 Carl Thomas
 Thompson Twins
 The Three Degrees
 T.I.
 Tichina Arnold
 Tierra
 Justin Timberlake
 The Time
 TLC
 Today
 Tom Tom Club
 Tonéx
 Tony! Toni! Toné!
 Total
 Tower of Power
 Robert Townsend
 The Trammps
 T.Q.
 Ralph Tresvant
 Trillville
 Trin-i-tee 5:7
 Truth Hurts
 Tina Turner
 Tweet
 Cicely Tyson

U

 Leslie Uggams
 The Undisputed Truth
 Urban Mystic
 Usher

V

 Frankie Valli
 Luther Vandross
 Vanity
 Vanity 6
 Gino Vannelli
 Melvin Van Peebles
 Countess Vaughn
 Ben Vereen
 Village People
 Tiffany Villarreal
 Lark Voorhies

W

 Jack Wagner
 Junior Walker
 James Walker aka Truck Driver
 George Wallace
 War
 Warren G
 Dionne Warwick
 Was (Not Was)
 Jody Watley
 Keenen Ivory Wayans
 Veronica Webb
 Mary Wells
 Kim Weston
 The Whispers
 Barry White
 Whodini
 Wild Cherry
 Wild Orchid
 Deniece Williams
 Michelle Williams
 Roshumba Williams
 Vanessa Williams
 Billy Dee Williams
 Al Wilson
 Charlie Wilson
 Jackie Wilson
 Nancy Wilson
 BeBe Winans
 Angela Winbush
 Bill Withers
 Bobby Womack
 Stevie Wonder
 Wreckx-n-Effect
 Keke Wyatt

XYZ

 Xscape
 Xzibit
 YahZarah
 Ying Yang Twins
 Young Black Teenagers
 YoungBloodZ
 Young Rome
 Zapp

Performances by non-black artists

In addition to the acts on the preceding list of white, Asian, Latino, Arabic and Pacific Islander performers, Soul Train also featured performances from the following acts with mixed race personnel: 
 Rufus (September 29, 1973, September 7, 1974, February 15, 1975, December 13, 1975, June 12, 1976, February 5, 1977, April 4, 1981)
 Tower of Power (November 10, 1973)
 Sly & The Family Stone (June 29, 1974)
 Graham Central Station (January 11, 1975 and October 7, 1978)
 War (November 15, 1975, February 15, 1978, May 22, 1982)
 K.C. and the Sunshine Band (November 27, 1976)
 Village People (May 3, 1980)
 Spyro Gyra (January 24, 1981)
 The System (July 9, 1983, November 23, 1985 and April 18, 1987)
 Mary Jane Girls (November 5, 1983 and April 13, 1985)
 Was (Not Was) (April 8, 1989)
 Color Me Badd (May 11, 1991, October 12, 1991, December 18, 1993 and May 30, 1998)
 The Brand New Heavies (October 29, 1991 and May 24, 1997)
 Prince and The New Power Generation (May 7, 1994)
 The Black Eyed Peas (October 24, 1998)
 C-Note (June 5, 1999).

References

Soul Train
Soul Train